The Cessna 208 Caravan is used by governmental organizations and by many companies for police, air ambulance, passenger transport, air charter, freight, and parachuting operations. With 239 aircraft, FedEx is the largest operator of the Cessna 208.

Operators

Government

Argentine Army

Royal Bahamas Defence Force

Royal Bahraini Air Force

Bangladesh Army

Brazilian Air Force

Cameroon Air Force

Chadian Air Force

Chilean Army

Colombian Air Force
Colombian Army
Colombian Navy

Djibouti Air Force
 
Dominican Air Force

Guatemalan Air Force

Honduran Air Force

Municipality of Mimika Regency 

Iraqi Air Force

Royal Jordanian Air Force

Kenya Air Force

Lebanese Air Force

Malian Air Force

Mauritania Air Force

Niger Air Force

Pakistan Army

National Aeronaval Service

Paraguayan Air Force

Peruvian Army

Philippine Air Force
Philippine Coast Guard 

 Rwandan Air Force

South African Air Force

Coastal Aviation 
Uganda People's Defence Force
Aerolink Uganda
Air Serv Limited
 
United Arab Emirates Air Force

United States Army
United States Marshals Service
New York City Police Department

Venezuelan Air Force
Bolivarian Navy of Venezuela

Yemeni Air Force

Zambian Air Force

Civilian

Skytrans Airlines

Maya Island Air

Wilderness Air
Mack Air

Asian One Air
Dimonim Air
Susi Air

Barrier Air

Federal Airlines

FedEx Feeder
Grand Canyon Scenic Airlines

 Wilderness Air

References 

208
Cessna aircraft